Moodna olivella is a species of snout moth in the genus Moodna. It was described by George Hampson in 1901 and is known from Brazil (including Rio de Janeiro, the type location).

References

Moths described in 1901
Phycitinae